Numonohi is the old name for the New Tribes Mission headquarters center in Papua New Guinea. In 2000, the center changed its name from Numonohi to Lapilo at the request of the local nationals.  Numonohi facilitates the support and coordination of Bible translation, church planting and medical work for New Tribes Mission throughout the Papua New Guinea mainland. 

The Numonohi center hosts Numonohi Christian Academy, a missionary boarding school which currently educates approximately 170 students from first through twelfth grade. The school itself was started back in 1966. The center also hosts a store, post office, carpentry and mechanical shops, administration buildings, dorms, both medical and dental centers, a gymnasium as well as outdoor basketball/tennis courts and roughly 75 houses.

Numonohi is a word from the local dialect which means "rubbish land", an appropriate name for land that was not highly valued when it was originally leased to the mission organization years ago. The name stuck, but NTM has transformed this land into a beautiful community over the years. However, with the rise of crime in PNG, missionaries have also become targets. Due to many incidents over the years a security fence was erected to protect the missionaries. Before the eight-foot chain-link fence was built it was not uncommon for neighboring tribes to assemble on the soccer field and launch their spears and arrows at one another.

Numonohi's elevation is slightly over 5,200 feet and is located at Lapilo south of Goroka, which is the provincial capitol.

References

External links
 Numonohi Christian Academy official website 

Christian missions in Oceania
Christianity in Papua New Guinea